Fornara is a surname. Notable people with the surname include:

 Carlo Fornara (1871–1968), Italian painter
 Pasquale Fornara (1925–1990), Italian cyclist
 Serge Fornara (born 1955), French rower
 Tim Fornara (born 1977), British television producer and director